Interlake Maritime Services is an American shipping firm that was created in December 2020 after Interlake Steamship Company purchased the assets of Pere Marquette Shipping Company and Lake Michigan Car Ferry Company, including the car ferry , MT Undaunted, ATB Pere Marquette 41, and . Its corporate headquarters is located in Middleburg Heights, a suburb of Cleveland, Ohio, with additional regional offices in Duluth, Minnesota, and Ludington, Michigan.

Subsidiaries
Interlake Maritime Services owns the following companies:
 Interlake Logistics Services - this division formerly operated a chartered cargo ship Montville
 Interlake Logistics Solutions
 Interlake Port Services
 Interlake Steamship Company
 Lake Michigan Carferry Service

External links
 Official Interlake Steamship Company Website
 Official SS Badger Lake Michigan Car Ferry Website

References

American companies established in 2020
Interlake Maritime Services
Great Lakes
Companies based in Middleburg Heights, Ohio
Transportation companies based in Ohio
Companies based in Ohio
Great Lakes Shipping Companies
Shipping companies of the United States